The Tel Aviv Light Rail, also known as Dankal is a planned mass transit system for the Tel Aviv metropolitan area in central Israel. The system will include different modes of mass transit, including rapid transit (metro), light rail transit (LRT), and bus rapid transit (BRT). Overseen by the government agency NTA, the project will complement the intercity and suburban rail network operated by Israel Railways.

As of 2021, three LRT lines are under construction. Work on the Red Line, the first in the project, started on September 21, 2011, following years of preparatory works, and was expected to be completed in late 2022 after numerous delays. Construction of the Purple Line started in December 2018; work on the Green Line began in January 2019.

The network was originally planned to be called "MetroTLV" but was changed to "Dankal".

History

The first proposals for a tramway in the area were made by the Lebanese engineer George Franjieh in November 1892, about nine weeks after the inauguration of the Jaffa–Jerusalem railway. The plan called for a main line between southern and northeastern Jaffa, with spurs to the harbor and the eastern orchards. The plan was considered uneconomical and was shelved. A later plan called for a light railway from Jaffa to the nearby settlements of Rishon LeZion, Petah Tikva and Wilhelma.

A Decauville light railway was built in Jaffa and Tel Aviv in World War I, connecting the port with the Yarkon River. It was used for about a decade after the war, and dismantled at a later date.

A subway system was first planned in the mid-1960s but a station at the Shalom Meir Tower was all that was completed of the project with no rails laid.

Revised plan: Light Rail
In 2000, the plan for a subway was changed to one for light rail, and more plausible plans for a mass transit system in Tel Aviv were unveiled. After the first Red Line spanning  was approved, excavation began in late 2009, with construction of the underground stations starting in August 2015. The Red Line is expected to become operational in Nov 2022.

In December 2006, the MTS group was awarded a BOT contract for the Red Line of the light rail, by which they are to build and operate the line for its first 32 years. MTS consisted of Africa Israel, Siemens of Germany, the Egged Bus Cooperative, Chinese infrastructure company CCECC, the Portuguese infrastructure firm Soares da Costa, and the leading Dutch transportation company HTM. After many years of delays due to MTS financing issues, in December 2010 the government revoked MTS's concession and nationalized the project, putting it under the authority of NTA, the government agency which was in charge of overseeing the overall development of the rapid transit system in the Tel Aviv metro area.

Current status
Construction on the first line, from Bat Yam to Petah Tikva, began in August 2015. In February 2017, most of the stations on the Red Line were already under construction. The preparations for the construction of the second line (Green Line) started on February 5, 2017, on Ibn Gabirol Street in Tel Aviv. Infrastructure works for the Purple Line began in December 2018.

Light rail

All three LRT lines are under construction.

Red Line 
 of the  Red Line is to be built underground, with the remaining overground segment constructed as a light rail/tram. It is to have 34 stops, 10 of which will be underground, with an average distance of about 1000 meters between underground stops and of about 500 metres between overground stops. The line would run from Bat Yam in the southwest, through Jaffa and central Tel Aviv, and carry on to Petah Tikva, through Ramat Gan and Bnei Brak. An interchange is planned for Tel Aviv Central railway station. It has been forecast that by 70 million passengers would be using this line annually.

Stations (underground in italics): HaKomemiyut, He'Amal, Kaf Tet BeNovember, Yoseftal, Binyamin, Balfour, Jabotinsky, Rothschild, Ha'Atsma'ut, Mahrozet, HaBesht, Isakov, Ehrlich, Bloomfield Stadium, Shalma (Salame), Elifelet, Allenby, Carlebach, Yehudit, Sha'ul HaMelekh, Arlosoroff, Abba Hillel, Bialik, Ben-Gurion, Aharonovich. From Aharonovich, one branch continues to Shenkar, Shaham, Beilinson, Dankner, Krol, Pinsker, Petah Tikva Central Bus Station (Terminal); another continues to Em HaMoshavot Bridge and Kiryat Arye.

The work on Allenby station began on February 8, 2015.

In May 2021, a test run of the red line began in Petah Tikva.

Green Line

It will have 62 stops that would run from the west of Rishon LeZion northwards through Holon through central Tel Aviv splitting into two branches: one to Herzliya in the north and the other one to Ramat HaHayal neighborhood in Tel Aviv in the northeast. Only its central Tel Aviv segment, four of the 62 stations, be underground, from Levinski Street through Ibn Gabirol Street until the Yarkon River. The expected annual passenger forecast is 65 million. NTA is including the design and boring of the Green Line's tunnels as part of Red Line's tunnels overall contract so that work on the Green Line's underground portion can commence immediately following the completion of the Red Line tunnels.
The preparations for the construction of this line begun in February 2017 in Ibn Gabirol street in Tel Aviv.

Purple Line

The third, or Purple Line, is envisaged as a  line with 43 stops and will connect Sheba Hospital through Giv'at Shmuel and Kiryat Ono, and will connect Arlozorov in Tel Aviv to Yehud and Or Yehuda through Ramat Gan. This line will be over-ground for its entire route.

Cancelled lines

Yellow Line
This line would have begun in Kfar Saba then continued on to Hod Hasharon, Herzliya, Ramat Hasharon on Sokolov Street, before joining Ben-Gurion Street in Ramat Gan, then Yitzhak Rabin Street in Givataim, then Moshe Dayan Street in Tel Aviv, Mikveh Israel, it would end in Holon after crossing Ariel Sharon Park. Parts of it were superseded by the M1 metro line.

Metro

The rapid transit plan for the Tel Aviv metropolitan area, conceived and approved in 2016, called for three underground metro lines, centered on Tel Aviv: a north–south line (M1), an east–west line (M2), and a circular line (M3). The lines are currently undergoing an individual approval process.

Bus rapid transit
Most BRT lines planned for the Tel Aviv metropolitan area were cancelled in 2016 and replaced with metro lines. Only plans for the Brown Line were retained, however, no date for start of construction has been announced.

Brown Line
The Brown Line is a planned BRT line that will serve the southern metropolitan area. Starting at Moshe Dayan Railway Station in western Rishon LeZion, it will continue east via central Rishon LeZion, bypassing Assaf HaRofeh Medical Center, until Ramle, where it splits into two branches: one continues to Lod in the northeast and the second continues to eastern Ramle in the east. There is a possibility of making it a light rail line eventually.

Cancelled lines

Blue Line
The Blue Line was the first BRT line not to pass via Tel Aviv. The line would have begun in Rehovot and continued to HaRishonim Railway Station in Rishon LeZion via Ness Ziona and ended at the Holon junction. This line was superseded by the M1 metro line.

Pink Line
The Pink Line was planned to serve the northern metropolitan area, beginning in northeastern Kfar Saba and continuing through its main streets until crossing Highway 4 to Ra'anana, continuing through Ahuza Street until western Ra'anana, and continuing to Herzliya and crossing it until the Marina area, where it would have terminated. This line was superseded by the M1 and M3 metro lines.

Orange Line
The Orange Line would have been the only line isolated from the system. It would serve only the city of Netanya in the northern metropolitan area. It would be a circular line that connects both sides of the city, crossing Highway 2.

See also
 Carmelit
 Jerusalem Light Rail
 List of tram and light rail transit systems

References

External links

NTA (in English) – Tel Aviv Subway developer, builder and operator.
NTA (in Hebrew) 
Map of all lines on Govmap.gov.il
Tel Aviv Light Rail on Urbanrail.net

Rapid transit in Israel
Transport in Tel Aviv
Underground rapid transit in Israel
Light rail in Israel
Proposed railway lines in Israel
Tram and light rail transit systems under construction